Reaksyon (lit. Reaction) was a late night news magazine and public affairs show on TV5 hosted by Luchi Cruz-Valdes. It is inspired of the now-defunct newscast Aksyon.

This program airs every Monday, Wednesday and Friday from 10:30 to 10:45pm and every Tuesday and Thursday from 10:45 to 11:00pm. (PST) after Aksyon Tonite. The show aired on TV5 and simulcast on AksyonTV and on radio through Radyo5 92.3 News FM.

It is also have a short-lived weekend edition from August–November 2012 anchored by Martin Andanar.

Background
News5 gives birth to a new genre in broadcasting with Reaksyon, a news magazine and public affairs segment that will widen people's knowledge of the news through in-depth reports and first hand insights from a mix of young and seasoned journalists of the news organization led by Luchi Cruz-Valdes.

This program delivers a brief but broad look at stories through exposés, and easy-to-digest investigative reports. Consistent with its name, Reaksyon also hears both sides of the story, and equally important, hears viewers’ insights on every issue being presented.

Reaksyon briefly ceased airing on July 18, 2014 as it morphed as an segment of newly reformatted Aksyon Prime, in which Valdes will be the anchor, but it resumed its airing on November 3, and its segment on the newscast is now aired as Reaksyon Agad, a preview for the latest Reaksyon episode.

The program had its last episode after 5 years on November 3, 2017 as part of ESPN 5's upcoming expansion.

Hosts

Main host
Luchi Cruz-Valdes

Substitute hosts
Ed Lingao
Cheryl Cosim
Lourd de Veyra

Former hosts
Martin Andanar - As an anchor of Reaksyon Weekend from August to November 2012.
Erwin Tulfo - As a substitute anchor for Valdez from early to late of 2016; Currently moved to PTV4.

Former segments
FYI: For Your Information - trivia
Ano ang Reaksyon Mo? - editorials

Awards
Best Public Affairs Program - 12th Gawad Tanglaw Awards

See also
 List of programs broadcast by TV5 (Philippine TV network)
 List of programs aired by TV5 (Philippine TV network)

References

External links
TV5 Official website
Reaksyon on Facebook

TV5 (Philippine TV network) original programming
2012 Philippine television series debuts
2017 Philippine television series endings
Philippine television news shows
News5 shows
Filipino-language television shows